The 2012 Eastern Washington Eagles football team represented Eastern Washington University in the 2012 NCAA Division I FCS football season. The team was coached by Beau Baldwin, who was in his fifth season with Eastern Washington. The Eagles played their home games at Roos Field in Cheney, Washington and were a member of the Big Sky Conference. They finished the season 11–3, 7–1 in Big Sky play to share the conference championship with Cal Poly and Montana State. They received the Big Sky's automatic bid into the FCS Playoffs where they defeated Wagner in the second round and Illinois State in the quarterfinals before falling in the semifinals to Sam Houston State.

Schedule

Source: Official Schedule
Despite also being a member of the Big Sky, the game against Cal Poly on November 3 was considered a non conference game and had no effect on the Big Sky standings.

Game summaries

@ Idaho

@ Washington State

@ Weber State

Montana

North Dakota

@ Montana State

Sacramento State

@ Southern Utah

Cal Poly

UC Davis

@ Portland State

FCS Playoffs

Wagner–FCS Playoffs Second Round

Illinois State–FCS Quarterfinals

Sam Houston State–FCS Semifinals

Only previous meeting was in the 2004 FCS Playoffs quarterfinals.

Ranking movements

References

Eastern Washington
Eastern Washington Eagles football seasons
Big Sky Conference football champion seasons
Eastern Washington
Eastern Washington Eagles football